
Gmina Purda is a rural gmina (administrative district) in Olsztyn County, Warmian-Masurian Voivodeship, in northern Poland.

Villages
Gmina Purda contains the villages and settlements of Bałdy, Bałdzki Piec, Biedówko, Bruchwałd, Butryny, Chaberkowo, Gąsiorowo, Giławy, Groszkowo, Kaborno, Klebark Mały, Klebark Wielki, Klewki, Kołpaki, Kopanki, Łajs, Linowo, Marcinkowo, Nerwik, Nowa Kaletka, Nowa Wieś, Nowy Przykop, Nowy Ramuk, Ostrzeszewo, Pajtuński Młyn, Pajtuny, Patryki, Pokrzywy, Prejłowo, Przykop, Purda, Purda Leśna, Purdka, Silice, Stara Kaletka, Stary Olsztyn, Szczęsne, Trękus, Trękusek, Wojtkowizna, Wygoda, Wyrandy, Zaborowo and Zgniłocha.

Neighbouring gminas
Gmina Purda is bordered by the city of Olsztyn and by the gminas of Barczewo, Dźwierzuty, Jedwabno, Olsztynek, Pasym and Stawiguda.

References
Polish official population figures 2006

Purda
Olsztyn County